"Shiny Shiny" is a 1983 new wave song by the British band Haysi Fantayzee. The song is an anti-nuclear war song with humorous, nonsensical lyrics about war, politics, and violence, among other issues, which includes instruments such as a piano, fiddles, violins, and spoons, along with audio sound effects, loops, and a bouncy country music-like beat.  The song peaked at No. 16 in the United Kingdom and reached the top three in Australia. It also charted in Germany, New Zealand and the United States, where it became the band's only hit single to chart on the Billboard Hot 100, peaking at No. 74. The music video for the song also got some airplay on MTV and other music related shows and channels when it was first released. In addition, the song was performed on the British TV series, Top of the Pops.

Charts

Weekly charts

Year-end charts

References

Haysi Fantayzee songs
1983 singles
1983 songs
Anti-war songs
RCA Records singles
Songs written by Paul Caplin
Songs written by Jeremy Healy